The Canna Agriculture Group contains all of the varieties of Canna used in agriculture. Canna achira and Canna edulis (Latin: eatable) are generic terms used in South America to describe the cannas that have been selectively bred for agricultural purposes, normally derived from C. discolor. It is grown especially for its edible rootstock from which starch is obtained, but the leaves and young seed are also edible, and achira was once a staple foodcrop in Peru and Ecuador.

Farming varieties 
There are some named agricultural varieties, and published comparative studies have involved:

Many more traditional varieties exist worldwide, they have all involved human selection and so are classified as agricultural cultivars. Folk lore states that Canna edulis Ker-Gawl. is the variety grown for food in South America, but there is no scientific evidence to substantiate the name as a separate species. It is probable that this is simply a synonym of C. discolor, which is grown for agricultural purposes throughout South America and Asia. 

In the Andes, the rhizome can be harvested within 6 months from planting out and the yields range from 13 - 85 tonnes per hectare, with 22 - 50 tonnes being average, though larger yields are obtained after 8 – 10 months. In Queensland, Australia they are able to obtain a yield of 5-10 tons of C. 'Queensland Arrowroot' tubers per acre.

Most cultivated forms do not produce fertile seed. There are also sterile triploid forms, these contain a significantly higher proportion of starch, though their cropping potential is not known.

Animal fodder
The rhizomes and leaves are good fodder for cattle and pigs and it is grown for this purpose in Tropical Africa and Hawaii, where it is harvested 4–8 months after planting. The foliage of Agricultural Canna is also used for its silage making properties, which are superior to those of corn.

Human consumption
Canna is still grown for human consumption in the Andes and also in Vietnam and southern China, where the starch is used to make cellophane noodles.

Edible qualities
Rootstock - actually a rhizome, this can be eaten either raw or cooked. It is the source of canna starch which is used as a substitute for arrowroot. The starch is obtained by rasping the rhizome to a pulp, then washing and straining to get rid of the fibres. This starch is very digestible. The very young rhizomes can also be eaten cooked, they are sweet but fibrous. The rhizome can be very large, sometimes as long as a person's forearm. In Peru the rhizomes are baked for up to 12 hours by which time they become a white, translucent, fibrous and somewhat mucilaginous mass with a sweetish taste. The starch is in very large grains, about three times the size of potato starch grains, and can be seen with the naked eye. This starch is easily separated from the fibre of the rhizome.

Young shoots - these can be cooked and eaten as a green vegetable and are quite nutritious, containing at least 10% protein.

See also 
 Canna
 List of Canna species
 List of Canna cultivars
 List of Canna hybridists
 Canna leaf roller
 Canna virus
 Canna rust
 Japanese beetle

References

Notes

Bibliography
 Bourne, M.J., G.W. Lennox and S.A. Seddon. 1988. Fruits and Vegetables of the Caribbean. Macmillan Publishers Ltd., London.
 Chaté, E. - Le Canna, 1866.
 Facciola, S. 1990. Cornucopia: A Source Book of Edible Plants. Kampong Publications, Vista.
 
 Gade, Daniel W. Achira, the Edible Canna, Its Cultivation and Use in the Peruvian Andes. Soc. Economic Bot. Volume 20. pp. 407–415.
 Hajoon Jun, Ikhwan Jo, Soon Hwangbo, Jusam Lee, Katsi Imai, 2006, Feeding Value and In situ Digestibility of Edible Canna for Silage
 Honychurch, P.N. 1986. Caribbean Wild Plants and Their Uses. Macmillan Publishers Ltd., London.
 The Wealth of India. 1948-1973. Raw Materials, Vol. I-X. Indian Council of Scientific and Industrial Research, New Delhi.
 Khoshoo, T.N. & Guha, I. - Origin and Evolution of Cultivated Cannas. Vikas Publishing House.
 Lerman, J. C. and E. M. Cigliano. 1971. New carbon-14 evidence for six hundred years old Canna compacta seed. Nature 232: 568—570.
 Segeren, W & Maas, PJM - The genus Canna in northern South America (1971), Acta Botanica Neerlandica. 20(6): 663-680.
 Dr. E. Lewis Sturtevant (1887) Sturtevant's Edible Plants of the World, New York Agricultural Experiment Station.
 Tanaka, N. 1998. The Angiosperm flora of Singapore. Part 8. Cannaceae. Gard. Bull., Singapore 50: 3537, illus.
 Tanaka, N. 1998. On the genus Canna in Yaeyama Islands, the Ryukyus, Japan. J. Jap. Bot. 73: 165169, illus. (In Japanese, English sum.)
 Tanaka N. The utilization of edible Canna plants in southeastern Asia and southern China. Soc. Economic Bot. Volume 58. pp. 112–114.
 Tanaka, N. 2001. Taxonomic revision of the family Cannaceae in the New World and Asia. Makinoa ser. 2, 1:34–43.
 Donald Ugent, Shelia Pozorski and Thomas Pozorski. New Evidence for Ancient Cultivation of Canna edulis in Peru. Soc. Economic Bot. Volume 38. pp. 417–432.

External links
 Arrowroot, James M. Stephens, University of Florida
 plants for a Future - Canna Edulis
 Plants for a Future - Canna indica
 Reappraisal of Edible Canna as a High-Value Starch Crop in Vietnam
 Nobuyuki Tanaka, The utilization of edible Canna plants in southeastern Asia and southern China
 Nobuyuki Tanaka, Naoyoshi Inouch, and Tetsuo Koyama. Edible Canna and its Starch: An Under-Exploited Starch-Producing Plant Resource
 Progress in the Development of Economic Botany and Knowledge of Food Plants.
 Polyploidy in Cannas
 More polyploidy in Cannas

 
Tropical agriculture